Andrea De Vito (born 27 November 1991) is an Italian professional footballer who plays as a defender for  club Imolese.

Club career 
Born to parents from Montepaone, province of Catanzaro, Calabria, De Vito started playing football for amateur side Sant'Alessio, before joining Milan in 2002. In the 2009–10 season, he was a member of the under-20 squad who won the Coppa Italia Primavera, 25 years after the club's last success in the competition.

De Vito made his professional debut in a Coppa Italia game against Novara, on 13 January 2010. Three months later, on 24 April, he also made his Serie A debut, in an away game versus Palermo.

On 25 June 2011, Andrea De Vito was confirmed to have signed a deal with Lega Pro Prima Divisione club Foggia. But in July 2011 he left for Serie B club Cittadella in co-ownership deal.

On 31 January 2019, he signed with Rieti.

On 8 August 2019, he joined Fano on a 2-year contract.

On 15 January 2021, he moved to Cavese.

References

External links 
Primavera squad list at official club website 

Living people
1991 births
Association football defenders
Italian footballers
Serie A players
Serie B players
Serie C players
Serie D players
A.C. Milan players
A.S. Cittadella players
U.S. Avellino 1912 players
S.S.D. Varese Calcio players
U.S. Viterbese 1908 players
F.C. Rieti players
Alma Juventus Fano 1906 players
Cavese 1919 players
F.C. Grosseto S.S.D. players
Imolese Calcio 1919 players